Hans Christian Ulrik Midelfart (22 July 1772 – 1 December 1823) was a Norwegian Lutheran minister who served as a representative at the Norwegian Constitutional Assembly in 1814.

Hans Christian Ulrik Midelfart was born at  Byneset parish in Trondheim, Sør-Trøndelag, Norway. He was the son of a parish priest. He served as minister in the parish of Beitstad in Nord-Trøndelag from 1802 to 1814. He became pastor at Skogn in Levanger during 1814, and held this office until his death in 1823.

He represented Nordre Trondhjems amt at the Norwegian Constituent Assembly in 1814. He became a member of the Constitutional Committee,  and was regarded as belonging to the independence party (Selvstendighetspartiet).

References

1772 births
1823 deaths
19th-century Norwegian Lutheran clergy
Clergy from Trondheim
Norwegian priest-politicians
Fathers of the Constitution of Norway